is a train station in Abashiri, Hokkaidō, Japan.

Lines
Hokkaido Railway Company
Senmō Main Line Station B79

Adjacent stations

External links
 JR Hokkaido Katsuradai Station information 

Stations of Hokkaido Railway Company
Railway stations in Hokkaido Prefecture
Railway stations in Japan opened in 1967